The Malagasy ambassador in Washington, D. C. is the official representative of the Government in Antananarivo to the Government of the United States.

List of representatives

See also
 Embassy of Madagascar in Washington, D.C.

References 

 
United States
Madagascar